Trevor Johnson (25 January 1935 – 10 November 2016) was an Australian rules football player in the Victorian Football League (VFL).

Johnson played for Melbourne in the five VFL grand finals, winning four.

References

External links

Profile at DemonWiki

1935 births
2016 deaths
Melbourne Football Club players
Epping Football Club players
Australian rules footballers from Victoria (Australia)
Four-time VFL/AFL Premiership players
Melbourne Football Club Premiership players